Leptacinus is a genus of beetles belonging to the family Staphylinidae.

The genus has cosmopolitan distribution.

Species:
 Leptacinus afghanus Bordoni, 2016 
 Leptacinus ajax Tottenham, 1949

References

Staphylinidae
Staphylinidae genera